KWYE (101.1 FM, "Y101") is a radio station in the Fresno, California, area that airs a hot adult contemporary music format. The station is owned by Cumulus Media. Its studios are at the Radio City building on Shaw Avenue in North Fresno and its transmitter is northeast of Clovis.

History

KCIB-FM went on the air in 1962 at 94.5 MHz. It began as a religious FM station, but when the Universal Broadcasting Company acquired it in 1968, it switched KCIB-FM to middle-of-the-road music using the call letters KFIG.  KCIB was co-located in Clovis at a site shared with KXQR-FM and KAIL TV 53. In late 1969, the format was changed to an "underground" album rock format patterned after San Francisco's KMPX. KFIG moved to 101.1 in 1973. This format lasted until the late 1970s, when the format was changed to adult contemporary, "Mellow Music". In 1984, the station adopted the "Yes/No Radio" format, where several times a day KFIG would play a song and invite listeners to call in and vote on whether or not KFIG should continue playing that song. After the "Yes/No Radio" format was retired, the station went back to being a regular adult contemporary station.

In September 1992, the callsign was changed to KSXY. Despite the obvious connotation of "Sexy" implied by that callsign, station management initially insisted that they were NOT meaning to imply "Sexy" by that choice of callsign. For about six months, the airstaff read the call letters as K–S (pause) X-Y. After that time, the station nickname was changed to "Sexy 101.1".

"Sexy" lasted until Headliner Broadcasting sold the station to EBE Broadcasting, who owned KNAX and KFRE-AM. In June 1994, the new owners changed the format of KSXY to country. They heralded the format change by playing nothing but Garth Brooks music under the "101.1 K-Garth" name, and then relaunched as "Froggy Country 101.1" KRBT. Froggy Country was a satellite format and did not make much of a ratings impact in the Fresno market.

When the station was sold to Infinity Broadcasting, the owners of KSKS, the format was changed to modern adult contemporary with the nickname of "Star 101" in September 1996. The callsign was changed to KVSR at that time. Star 101 was successful until KTHT changed format to "Alice", which gave them some competition. Both stations competed with the format until Star 101 threw in the towel, becoming "Y101" sometime in 2002. As Y-101, they fired most of their air staff and began a new on-air campaign changing to a top 40 format and branding themselves as "Y101, #1 for All the Hits", hiring a whole new staff of DJs and starting a new morning show called the "Y101 Morning Zoo."

On December 13, 2006, new owners Peak Broadcasting pulled the plug on KWYE's Top 40 format and flipped the station to adult contemporary, billing themselves as the place for "Today's Hits, Yesterday Favorites." The reason for this might have to do with Fresno/Hanford/Visalia radio market already being saturated with two other Top 40s, Rhythmic rivals KBOS and KSEQ.  Although KWYE maintained good ratings in the market, it wasn't enough to overtake the Rhythmics, especially in a market with a large Hispanic population.

Recently, KWYE has tweaked its format to include more current hits, dropping the hits from the 1970s from their playlist, and changing their slogan to "80's, 90's, Now."  In mid-April 2009, KWYE segued into a Modern AC format.

On August 30, 2013, a deal was announced in which Townsquare Media would purchase Peak Broadcasting, and then immediately swap Peak's Fresno stations, including KWYE, to Cumulus Media in exchange for Cumulus' stations in Dubuque, Iowa and Poughkeepsie, New York. The deal is part of Cumulus' acquisition of Dial Global; Peak, Townsquare, and Dial Global are all controlled by Oaktree Capital Management. The sale to Cumulus was completed on November 14, 2013.

References

External links
KWYE website

WYE
Hot adult contemporary radio stations in the United States
Radio stations established in 1969
1969 establishments in California
Cumulus Media radio stations